The Full Frame Documentary Film Festival is an annual international event dedicated to the theatrical exhibition of non-fiction cinema.

The festival is a program of the Center for Documentary Studies, a non-profit, 501(c)(3) at Duke University. This event receives financial support from corporate sponsors, private foundations, and individual donors. The Presenting Sponsor of the Festival is Duke University. Additional sponsors include: A&E IndieFilms, Academy of Motion Pictures Arts & Sciences, National Endowment for the Arts, Merge Records, Whole Foods, Hospitality Group (parent company for Saladelia Cafe and Madhatter Bakeshop and Cafe), and the City of Durham.

The festival began in 1998 with no more than a few hundred patrons and has grown tremendously since then. Full Frame is now considered to be one of the premier documentary film festivals in the United States. The Festival was founded by Nancy Buirski, a Pulitzer Prize-winning photo editor of The New York Times and documentary filmmaker.

Full Frame became a qualifying festival for the Producers Guild of America (PGA) Award for Best Documentary in 2012, and a qualifying festival for the Academy Award for Best Documentary (Short Subject) in 2013.

Full Frame also presents documentary work in other venues both locally and nationally, partnering with organizations like the American Tobacco Historic District/Capitol Broadcasting Company, Des Moines Art Center, Duke University, the IFC Center, the International Affairs Council of North Carolina, the Nasher Museum of Art at Duke University, the National Association of Latino Independent Producers, PNC Financial Services, Rooftop Films, and the University of North Carolina (UNC) School System.

Attendees have included Michael Moore, D. A. Pennebaker, Martin Scorsese, Danny DeVito, Ken Burns, Joan Allen, Al Franken, and Steve James.

Curated series
Each year the festival invites a member of the documentary filmmaking community to curate a series of films on a specific topic. The curated series have included:
 1998: Tolerance, curator Larry Kardish
 1999: World Without Limits 2000: Outside Looking In: Coming of Age Stories, curator Alan Berliner
 2001: 2001 - Fast Forward, curator Kent Jones, Film Society of Lincoln Center
 2002: Score!, curator DA Pennebaker
 2003: Leadership Through a Gender Lens, curators Marie Wilson and Chris Hegedus
 2004: Hybrid: A New Film Form, curator Mary Lea Bandy
 2005: Why War?, curator Cara Mertes
 2006: Class in America, curator St. Clair Bourne
 2007: The Power of 10, curators St. Clair Bourne, Charles Burnett, Ariel Dorfman, Cara Mertes, Michael Moore, Walter Mosley, Mira Nair, DA Pennebaker, Julia Reichert, and Martin Scorsese
 2009: Migrations, curator Lourdes Portillo
 2009: This Sporting Life, curator Steve James
 2010: Work and Labor, curators Steve Bognar and Julia Reichert
 2011: One Foot in the Archives, curator Rick Prelinger
 2012: Family Affairs, curator Ross McElwee
 2013: Stories About Stories, curator Amir Bar-Lev
 2014: Approaches to Character, curator Lucy Walker
 2015: The Moral Compass, curator Jennifer Baichwal
2016: Perfect and Otherwise: Documenting American Politics, curator R. J. Cutler
2017:  DoubleTake, curator Sadie Tillery
 2018: Crime and Punishment, curator Joe Berlinger

Tribute award
From 1998 to 2011, the festival presented a filmmaker with the Full Frame Career Award. In 2012, this award was changed to the Full Frame Tribute. Past recipients include:
 1998: Albert Maysles, Michael Apted
 2000: D. A. Pennebaker, Chris Hegedus
 2001: Barbara Kopple
 2003: Charles Guggenheim
 2004: Marcel Ophüls
 2005: Ken Burns, Ric Burns
 2006: Richard Leacock
 2007: Ross McElwee
 2008: William Greaves
 2009: St. Clair Bourne
 2010: Liz Garbus and Rory Kennedy
 2011: Ricki Stern and Annie Sundberg
 2012: Stanley Nelson
 2013: Jessica Yu
 2014: Steve James
 2015: Marshall Curry
2016: Kirsten Johnson
 2018: Jehane Noujaim

Industry award
Occasionally, the festival honors an industry member who has made important contributions to the field with the Full Frame Industry Award. Past recipients include:
 2000: Sheila Nevins
 2001: Soros Documentary Fund/Diane Weyermann
 2003: Pat Mitchell
 2007: P.O.V./Marc Weiss

Awards
The festival offers a number of prizes at each festival.

The prizes awarded at the 2016 festival were:
 The Reva and David Logan Grand Jury Award for the best feature film.
 The Full Frame Jury Award for Best Short for the best film of 40 minutes or less.
 The Full Frame Audience Award for a short film and a feature film chosen by ballot of the attendees of the festival.
 The Center for Documentary Studies (CDS) Filmmaker Award for the film that best combines originality and creativity with firsthand experience in examining central issues of contemporary life and culture.
 The Charles E. Guggenheim Emerging Artist Award for the best first-time documentary feature filmmaker.
 The Full Frame President's Award for the best student film.
 The Kathleen Bryan Edwards Award for Human Rights for a film that addresses a significant human rights issue in the United States.

Past Kathleen Bryan Edwards Award for Human Rights are:
 2020: Us Kids, Directed by Kim A. Snyder
 2019: Mossville: When Great Trees Fall, Directed by Alexander Glustrom

Past Grand Jury Award winners are:
 1998: In Harm's Way, Travis
 1999: Return with Honor, Fotoamator
 2000: La Bonne du Conduite: 5 Histoires d' Auto Ecole (The Way I Look at You: 5 Stories of Driving School''')
 2001: Benjamin Smoke, Avant de Partir 2002: The First Year 2003: Etre et Avoir 2004: Control Room 2005: Murderball, Shape of the Moon 2006: Iraq in Fragments 2007: The Monastery 2008: Trouble the Water 2009: Burma VJ 2010: Enemies of the People 2011: Scenes of a Crime 2012: Special Flight (Vol Special)
 2013: American Promise 2014: Evolution of a Criminal 2015: (T)error, Kings of Nowhere2016: Starless Dreams2017: QUEST 2018: Hale County This Morning, This Evening (special jury award Of Fathers and Sons)
 2019: One Child Nation 2020: Mayor 2022: I Didn't See You There''

References

External links

Film festivals in North Carolina
Documentary film festivals in the United States
Tourist attractions in Durham, North Carolina
Duke University